Tian Qi or Tianqi may refer to:

History
Qi (state) ( 1046–221 BC) after the Usurpation of Qi by Tian ( 481–379 BC)
Tianqi (558–560), era name of Xiao Zhuang (548–577?) of the Liang dynasty
Tianqi (1620–1627), era name of the Tianqi Emperor (1605–1627) of the Ming dynasty

Modern people
Tian Qi (cricketer)
Qi Tian, researcher at the University of Texas at San Antonio

Other topics
Panax notoginseng, known as tianqi in Chinese, a species of the genus Panax widely used in traditional Chinese medicine
Tianqi porcelain 
Tianqi Lithium, Chinese mining and manufacturing company